Giant is a 2017 Basque-language drama film directed by Aitor Arregi and Jon Garaño. The film premiered at the 2017 San Sebastián International Film Festival, where it was awarded the Special Jury Prize. The film was also screened at the 2017 BFI London Film Festival.

At the 32nd Goya Awards, the film won ten awards, including Best Original Screenplay, Best New Actor (Eneko Sagardoy), and Best Original Score (Pascal Gaigne).

Plot summary

Cast
  as Martin
 Eneko Sagardoy as Joaquin
 Iñigo Aranburu as Arzadun
  as Antonio
 Aia Kruse as María

Plot
Martin Eleizegi is an unwilling conscript in the First Carlist War. While fighting, he is injured and loses the use of his right arm. He returns to his family's small farm in the village of Altzo in the Basque Country, where he discovers his younger brother, Joaquin, has grown into a giant. Martin, longing to emigrate to America, sees the commercial opportunity in marketing the "tallest man on Earth." The brothers travel around Europe, despite Joaquin's increasing discomfort of being a freak attraction. Joaquin measures himself each night and is horrified that he continues to grow well into his twenties, and suffers from increasing aches and pains. He suspects that the condition is terminal.

Martin attempts to appear more sophisticated by learning Spanish and wearing modern fashions. He briefly believes he blends in, yet his background and Basque accent betray him. Embittered, he and Joaquin travel abroad through Spain, France and England. The brothers eventually visit Stonehenge where, in a surreal, early morning ritual, Joaquin is introduced to two other giants: Saad and Esther.

In Paris, Joaquin's pain intensifies. He is taken to a doctor, who formally diagnoses Joaquin with gigantism. The doctor asks if Joaquin would sell his bones to science after he passes away. Joaquin replies that he wants to be buried in Altzo.

Joaquin and Esther meet up for a romantic encounter. She shows interest, but he is too self-conscious and possibly impotent, due his condition. Their night ends with Esther upset and confused as Joaquin angrily sends her away.

When the brothers briefly return home, Martin marries Maria, whom Joaquin courted before he grew to an unusual height. Martin and Joaquin continue to tour, with the intention of using Joaquin's wages to secure ownership of the family farm. Joaquin, suspicious of being exploited, secretly hoards them. When their carriage is robbed by highwaymen, all of Joaquin's money is stolen. To prevent losing the farm, Martin gives up his own earnings, which he had planned to use to move to America.

In an attempt to recoup their losses, the brothers continue to tour. However, Joaquin's physical health deteriorates and their audiences dwindle. One day, Joaquin is chased into the woods by a wolf and nearly freezes to death. When the brothers reunite, Martin recognizes Joaquin's undying loyalty and they return home for good.

Joaquin dies from his medical condition and is buried in Altzo. He leaves a surprising amount of money to Martin, though the source of it is unclear. Years later, after Martin's father dies, he digs up Joaquin's grave to make room in the family cemetery. He discovers the grave is empty and realizes the money likely came from the selling of Joaquin's bones. Martin reflects on how all physical traces of Joaquin are slowly disappearing, but he won't forget his brother.

Critical reception
The film won several Goya awards in Spain and has been described as the most technically accomplished to date Basque-language movie. English language critics have been equally enthusiastic, praising especially its visual brilliance while noting that the plot loses momentum towards the end.

, Giant holds a 70% approval rating on Rotten Tomatoes, based on ten reviews with an average rating of 6.5 out of 10.

Awards

Addendum
Though it had been long believed that the body of  had been sold or stolen, the mystery was solved three years after the movie was released when a team from the  exhumed his bones in the local Altzo cemetery.

References

External links
 
 

2017 films
2010s historical drama films
Basque-language films
Spanish historical drama films
2017 drama films
Kowalski Films films
2010s Spanish films